Staphopain (staphylopain) is an enzyme. This enzyme catalyses the following chemical reaction

 Broad endopeptidase action on proteins including elastin, but rather limited hydrolysis of small-molecule substrates.

This enzyme is present in several species of Staphylococcus.

References

External links 
 

EC 3.4.22